Daniela Romo is the debut album by Mexican pop singer Daniela Romo, released on 1983. A previous album had been released in 1979, but it was not promoted nor commercially significant and it is not considered her debut. This album had a commercial appeal targeted to teenagers and young adults with catchy pop songs and it was a big success in Latin America.

History
To critics and fans, this is seen as Romo's debut, as the real first album did not meet with any success (critical or otherwise), and few know of its existence. She debuted as a writer on several songs. Danilo Vaona wrote "Mentiras" ("Lies"); another prominent singer who wrote for her was Miguel Bosé on the song "Pobre secretaria" ("Poor Secretary").

Track listing
 "Mentiras"
 "La ocasión para amarnos"
 "Te amo"
 "Celos"
 "El fin de un amor"
 "Pobre secretaria"
 "Ayúdame"
 "Ven a mi fiesta"
 "No no puedo ya dejarte"
 "Ayer perdí mi corazón"

Singles
 "Mentiras"
 "La ocasión para amarnos"
 "Celos"

Covers
 Singer Fanny Lu covered the song "Celos" for her 2009 album Dos.

Reference list

1983 debut albums
Daniela Romo albums